For Public Good Party, or For All Mankind Equality Party, is a Chinese nationalist right-wing political party in Taiwan (Republic of China). Advocating Chinese unification, the party was elected to local council and as township mayors.

History 
For Public Good Party and other parties, including China Zhi Gong Party which was part of the ruling United Front in China, originated from "Chee Kung Tong", an organisation under Hongmen. The party was founded on 18 December 2000 and was registered on 21 April 2002, with Wang Jui-sheng as founding chairperson. The Chinese name of the party originally carried "Chinese Taiwan", and was only amended to "Chinese nation" in 2017, two years after Chen Po-kuang take over.

"For Public Good", "For All Mankind Equality", "Zhi Gong", and "Chee Kung" all refer to the Chinese word "", with the latter two are the transliteration. "" is believed to be from "", meaning "committed to golden mean for justice".

The party supports the unification of Taiwan and China, and is relatively active in the interaction with Chinese political parties.

Leaders 
Below is the list of chairpersons of For Public Good Party:

 Wang Jui-sheng (王瑞陞) (2000–2015)
 Chen Po-kuang (陳柏光) (2015–)

Electoral performances 
The party first ran in 2018 local election, winning in Taoyuan and Kinmen.

See also 
 China Zhi Gong Party
 Tiandihui

References 

Conservative parties in Taiwan
Far-right politics in Taiwan
Social conservative parties
National conservative parties